Massachusetts House of Representatives' 7th Middlesex district in the United States is one of 160 legislative districts included in the lower house of the Massachusetts General Court. It covers part of Middlesex County. Democrat Jack Patrick Lewis of Framingham has represented the district since 2017.

Locales represented
The district includes the following localities:
 Ashland
 part of Framingham

The current district geographic boundary overlaps with that of the Massachusetts Senate's 2nd Middlesex and Norfolk district.

Former locale
The district previously covered part of Cambridge, circa 1872.

Representatives
 Nathan K. Noble, circa 1858-1859 
 Wm. Page, circa 1858 
 Wm. A. Saunders, circa 1858 
 Alanson Bigelow, circa 1859 
 William T. Richardson, circa 1859 
 Irving L. Russell, circa 1888 
 Edgar A. Bowers, circa 1920 
 John Robert Ayers, circa 1951 
 William E. Hays, circa 1951 
 Marie Elizabeth Howe, circa 1975 
 John Stefanini
 Karen Spilka
 Tom Sannicandro
 Jack Patrick Lewis, 2017-current

See also
 List of Massachusetts House of Representatives elections
 Other Middlesex County districts of the Massachusetts House of Representatives: 1st, 2nd, 3rd, 4th, 5th, 6th,  8th, 9th, 10th, 11th, 12th, 13th, 14th, 15th, 16th, 17th, 18th, 19th, 20th, 21st, 22nd, 23rd, 24th, 25th, 26th, 27th, 28th, 29th, 30th, 31st, 32nd, 33rd, 34th, 35th, 36th, 37th
 List of Massachusetts General Courts
 List of former districts of the Massachusetts House of Representatives

Images
Portraits of legislators

References

External links
 Ballotpedia
  (State House district information based on U.S. Census Bureau's American Community Survey).
 League of Women Voters of Framingham

House
Government of Middlesex County, Massachusetts